The Dalrymple-Hay Baronetcy, of Park Place in the County of Wigtown, is a title in the Baronetage of Great Britain. It was created on 27 April 1798 for Colonel John Dalrymple-Hay. Born John Dalrymple, he was the husband of Susan, daughter of Sir Thomas Hay, 3rd Baronet, of Park (see Hay baronets for earlier history of this title). On inheriting his father-in-law's estates in 1794 he assumed by Royal licence the additional surname of Hay. Four years later the baronetcy held by his father-in-law was revived in his favour. His grandson, the third Baronet (who succeeded his father), was an Admiral in the Royal Navy and Conservative politician. His third and youngest son, the fifth Baronet (who succeeded his childless elder brother), was a Clerk in the Foreign Office from 1887 to 1895 and in the Privy Council Office from 1895 to 1928. On his death the line of the third Baronet failed and the title passed to the late Baronet's first cousin twice removed, the sixth Baronet. He was the eldest son of Brian George Rowland Dalrymple-Hay (1898–1943), a Colonel in the Indian Cavalry, son of George Houston Dalrymple-Hay (1865–1948), fifth son of George James Dalrymple-Hay (1828–1891), a Colonel in the Bengal Staff Corps, second son of the second Baronet (and eldest son of his second marriage). As of 2009 the title is held by the seventh Baronet's son, the eighth Baronet, who succeeded in January 2009.

James Reginald Maitland Dalrymple-Hay (1858–1924), eldest son of the aforementioned Colonel George James Dalrymple-Hay, second son of the second Baronet, was a Brigadier-General of the Jamaica Forces. Sir Harley Dalrymple-Hay (1861–1940), second son of Colonel George James Dalrymple-Hay, was an engineer.

Dalrymple-Hay baronets, of Park Place (1798)
 Sir John Dalrymple-Hay, 1st Baronet (1746–1812)
 Sir James Dalrymple-Hay, 2nd Baronet (1789–1861)
 Sir John Charles Dalrymple-Hay, 3rd Baronet (1821–1912)
 Sir William Archibald Dalrymple-Hay, 4th Baronet (1851–1929)
 Sir Charles John Dalrymple-Hay, 5th Baronet (1865–1952)
 Sir James Brian Dalrymple-Hay, 6th Baronet (19 January 1928– 21 September 2005)
 Sir John Hugh Dalrymple-Hay, 7th Baronet (16 December 1929– 20 January 2009)
 Sir Malcolm John Robert Dalrymple-Hay, 8th Baronet (born 1966) – a surgeon based in Plymouth, Devon. 
				
The heir presumptive to the baronetcy is Ronald George Inglis Dalrymple-Hay (born 1933).

Notes

References
Kidd, Charles, Williamson, David (editors). Debrett's Peerage and Baronetage (1990 edition). New York: St Martin's Press, 1990, 

Dalrymple-Hay
1798 establishments in Great Britain